This is the discography for Cuban-American pop singer Jon Secada.

Albums

Studio albums

Compilation albums

Singles

As lead artist

As featured artist

Music videos

References

Discographies of Cuban artists
Pop music discographies